Salima Belhaj (born 18 October 1978) is a Dutch-Moroccan politician. She has been a member of the House of Representatives of the Netherlands for the Democrats 66 (D66) since 26 January 2016. She previously served as a municipal councillor and group president in Rotterdam between 2008 and 2016.

Career
Belhaj was born on 18 October 1978 in Harderwijk. She is of Moroccan descent, her father was a social worker. Belhaj moved to Rotterdam for her studies of Personnel and Work at the Rotterdam University of Applied Sciences, which she followed between 1998 and 2002. From 2004 to 2007 she was a personnel coordinator at the Museum Boijmans Van Beuningen. She worked as business leader of the De Appel theatre from 2007 to 2008.

Belhaj was number 10 on the D66 candidate list for the 2006 general election. She was member of the municipal council of Rotterdam for the Democrats 66 between January 2008 and January 2016. During this period she also was fraction leader. When Belhaj started she was the only council member for Democrats 66. During her later years in the council Democrats 66 became part of the municipal ruling coalition. On 26 January 2016 Belhaj became a member of the House of Representatives, when she replaced Wassila Hachchi. In the House she deals with topics as defence, harbors and infrastructure.

In October 2018, after Alexander Pechtold announced his departure as parliamentary leader in the House of Representatives, Belhaj was candidate to succeed him but lost to Rob Jetten. In 2021, she announced she would like to renounce her Moroccan passport, although she cannot do so by Moroccan law.

References

External links
  Parlement.com biography

1978 births
Living people
Democrats 66 politicians
Dutch people of Moroccan descent
Members of the House of Representatives (Netherlands)
Municipal councillors of Rotterdam
People from Harderwijk
21st-century Dutch politicians